Major Hugh Scott of Gala FRSE DL JP (1822–1877) was a 19th-century Scottish soldier.

Life

He was born on 9 December 1822 at Bellie near Elgin, the son of John Scott, 8th Laird of Gala (1790-1840), and his wife Magdalen Hope (1792-1873), the daughter of Sir Archibald Hope, 9th Baronet Hope of Craighall.

He was raised as a career soldier, joining the 92nd Regiment of Foot as a Captain and later becoming a Major in the Dumfries, Roxburgh and Selkirkshire Militia.

In 1840 he inherited the family home of Gala House in Galashiels and became 9th Laird of Gala.

In 1853 he was elected a Fellow of the Royal Society of Edinburgh.

In 1872 he commissioned the Edinburgh architect David Bryce to build a New Gala House in the Scots Baronial style; this work was completed in 1876. This house - known in its lifetime as Gala House - was lived in by his descendants until 1976 and was demolished in 1983.

He died in Hyeres in France on 19 December 1877.

The original Gala House is now a museum.

Family

In 1857 he married the heiress Elizabeth Isabella Johnstone-Gordon, from whom he was divorced on 6 December 1877. They had four children.

His estates passed to his eldest son, John Henry Francis Kinnaird Scott of Gala (1859-1935). His second son, Captain Hugh James Elibank Scott (1861-1934), in 1890 inherited the Makerstoun Estate near Kelso, from Scott relations who, in turn, had inherited under an entail from their cousin Anna-Maria Brisbane-Makdougall of Makerstoun (1786-1862), wife of General Sir Thomas Brisbane. Hugh J E Scott thereafter adopted the surname Scott-Makdougall.

His third son, Charles Archibald Ramsay Scott (1863-1920), a Major in the South Wales Borderers, fled to Wellington, New Zealand to escape his creditors in about 1911, where he married Violet Milligan in November 1911 and died in Auckland, New Zealand in 1920.

His daughter, Madalen Augusta Lavinia Scott, CBE, (1867-1961) married General Sir Francis Davies KCB, KCMG, KCVO (1864-1948) in 1896 and lived at Elmley Castle, Pershore, Worcestershire, England.

His great grandfather was Dr Alexander Monro (secundus).

.

References

1822 births
1877 deaths
Scottish landowners
Gordon Highlanders officers
Fellows of the Royal Society of Edinburgh
People from Moray
19th-century Scottish businesspeople